Ismael Al-Maeeni (Arabic:إسماعيل المعيني) (born 25 January 1989) is an Emirati footballer.  . He is one of the strongest defenders in UAE who played in famous clubs in UAE.

External links

References

Emirati footballers
1989 births
Living people
Al-Nasr SC (Dubai) players
Ajman Club players
Al Jazira Club players
Al-Wasl F.C. players
Al-Shaab CSC players
Hatta Club players
UAE First Division League players
UAE Pro League players
Association football defenders